In general relativity, the Vaidya metric describes the non-empty external spacetime of a spherically symmetric and nonrotating star which is either emitting or absorbing null dusts. It is named after the Indian physicist Prahalad Chunnilal Vaidya and constitutes the simplest non-static generalization of the non-radiative Schwarzschild solution to Einstein's field equation, and therefore is also called the "radiating(shining) Schwarzschild metric".

From Schwarzschild to Vaidya metrics 

The Schwarzschild metric as the static and spherically symmetric solution to Einstein's equation reads

Thus, introduce the "retarded(/outgoing)" null coordinate  by

and Eq(1) could be transformed into the "retarded(/outgoing) Schwarzschild metric"

or, we could instead employ the "advanced(/ingoing)" null coordinate  by

so Eq(1) becomes the "advanced(/ingoing) Schwarzschild metric"

Eq(3) and Eq(5), as static and spherically symmetric solutions, are valid for both ordinary celestial objects with finite radii and singular objects such as black holes. It turns out that, it is still physically reasonable if one extends the mass parameter  in Eqs(3) and Eq(5) from a constant to functions of the corresponding null coordinate,  and  respectively, thus

The extended metrics Eq(6) and Eq(7) are respectively the "retarded(/outgoing)" and "advanced(/ingoing)" Vaidya metrics. It is also sometimes useful to recast the Vaidya metrics Eqs(6)(7) into the form

where  represents the metric of flat spacetime.

Outgoing Vaidya with pure Emitting field

As for the "retarded(/outgoing)" Vaidya metric Eq(6), the Ricci tensor has only one nonzero component

while the Ricci curvature scalar vanishes,  because . Thus, according to the trace-free Einstein equation , the stress–energy tensor  satisfies

Box A below). According to the null energy conditions

we have  and thus the central body is emitting radiation.

Following the calculations using Newman–Penrose (NP) formalism in Box A, the outgoing Vaidya spacetime Eq(6) is of Petrov-type D, and the nonzero components of the Weyl-NP and Ricci-NP scalars are

It is notable that, the Vaidya field is a pure radiation field rather than electromagnetic fields. The emitted particles or energy-matter flows have zero rest mass and thus are generally called "null dusts", typically such as photons and neutrinos, but cannot be electromagnetic waves because the Maxwell-NP equations are not satisfied. By the way, the outgoing and ingoing null expansion rates for the line element Eq(6) are respectively

Suppose , then the Lagrangian for null radial geodesics  of the "retarded(/outgoing)" Vaidya spacetime Eq(6) is

where dot means derivative with respect to some parameter . This Lagrangian has two solutions,

Thus,  should be recognized as an outgoing solution while  serves as an ingoing solution. Now, we can construct a complex null tetrad which is adapted to the outgoing null radial geodesics and employ the Newman–Penrose formalism for perform a full analysis of the outgoing Vaidya spacetime. Such an outgoing adapted tetrad can be set up as

and the dual basis covectors are therefore

In this null tetrad, the spin coefficients are

The Weyl-NP and Ricci-NP scalars are given by

For the "retarded(/outgoing)" Schwarzschild metric Eq(3), let , and then the Lagrangian for null radial geodesics will have an outgoing solution  and an ingoing solution . Similar to Box A, now set up the adapted outgoing tetrad by

so the spin coefficients are

and the Weyl-NP and Ricci-NP scalars are given by

The "retarded(/outgoing)" Schwarzschild spacetime is of Petrov-type D with  being the only nonvanishing Weyl-NP scalar.

Ingoing Vaidya with pure absorbing field

As for the "advanced/ingoing" Vaidya metric Eq(7), the Ricci tensors again have one nonzero component

and therefore  and the stress–energy tensor is

This is a pure radiation field with energy density , and once again it follows from the null energy condition Eq(11) that , so the central object is absorbing null dusts. As calculated in Box C, the nonzero Weyl-NP and Ricci-NP components of the "advanced/ingoing" Vaidya metric Eq(7) are

Also, the outgoing and ingoing null expansion rates for the line element Eq(7) are respectively

The advanced/ingoing Vaidya solution Eq(7) is especially useful in black-hole physics as it is one of the few existing exact dynamical solutions. For example, it is often employed to investigate the differences between different definitions of the dynamical black-hole boundaries, such as the classical event horizon and the quasilocal trapping horizon; and as shown by Eq(17), the evolutionary hypersurface  is always a marginally outer trapped horizon.

Suppose , then the Lagrangian for null radial geodesics of the "advanced(/ingoing)" Vaidya spacetime Eq(7) is

Now, we can construct a complex null tetrad which is adapted to the ingoing null radial geodesics and employ the Newman–Penrose formalism for perform a full analysis of the Vaidya spacetime. Such an ingoing adapted tetrad can be set up as

and the dual basis covectors are therefore

In this null tetrad, the spin coefficients are

The Weyl-NP and Ricci-NP scalars are given by

For the "advanced(/ingoing)" Schwarzschild metric Eq(5), still let , and then the Lagrangian for the null radial geodesics will have an ingoing solution  and an outgoing solution . Similar to Box C, now set up the adapted ingoing tetrad by

so the spin coefficients are

and the Weyl-NP and Ricci-NP scalars are given by

The "advanced(/ingoing)" Schwarzschild spacetime is of Petrov-type D with  being the only nonvanishing Weyl-NP scalar.

Comparison with the Schwarzschild metric

As a natural and simplest extension of the Schwazschild metric, the Vaidya metric still has a lot in common with it:

 Both metrics are of Petrov-type D with  being the only nonvanishing Weyl-NP scalar (as calculated in Boxes A and B).

However, there are three clear differences between the Schwarzschild and Vaidya metric:

 First of all, the mass parameter  for Schwarzschild is a constant, while for Vaidya  is a u-dependent function.
 Schwarzschild is a solution to the vacuum Einstein equation , while Vaidya is a solution to the trace-free Einstein equation  with a nontrivial pure radiation energy field. As a result, all Ricci-NP scalars for Schwarzschild are vanishing, while we have  for Vaidya.
 Schwarzschild has 4 independent Killing vector fields, including a timelike one, and thus is a static metric, while Vaidya has only 3 independent Killing vector fields regarding the spherical symmetry, and consequently is nonstatic. Consequently, the Schwarzschild metric belongs to Weyl's class of solutions while the Vaidya metric does not.

Extension of the Vaidya metric

Kinnersley metric

While the Vaidya metric is an extension of the Schwarzschild metric to include a pure radiation field, the Kinnersley metric constitutes a further extension of the Vaidya metric; it describes a massive object that accelerates in recoil as it emits massless radiation anisotropically.
The Kinnersley metric is a special case of the Kerr-Schild metric, and in cartesian spacetime coordinates  it takes the following form:

where for the duration of this section all indices shall be raised and lowered using the "flat space" metric , the "mass"  is an arbitrary function of the proper-time  along the mass's world line as measured using the "flat" metric,  and  describes the arbitrary world line of the mass,  is then the four-velocity of the mass,  is a "flat metric" null-vector field implicitly defined by Eqn. (20), and  implicitly extends the proper-time parameter to a scalar field throughout spacetime by viewing it as constant on the outgoing light cone of the "flat" metric that emerges from the event  and satisfies the identity 
Grinding out the Einstein tensor for the metric  and integrating the outgoing energy–momentum flux "at infinity," one finds that the metric  describes a mass
The Kinnersley metric may therefore be viewed as describing the gravitational field of an accelerating photon rocket with a very badly collimated exhaust.

In the special case where  is independent of proper-time, the Kinnersley metric reduces to the Vaidya metric.

Vaidya–Bonner metric

Since the radiated or absorbed matter might be electrically non-neutral, the outgoing and ingoing Vaidya metrics Eqs(6)(7) can be naturally extended to include varying electric charges,

Eqs(18)(19) are called the Vaidya-Bonner metrics, and apparently, they can also be regarded as extensions of the Reissner–Nordström metric, analogously to the correspondence between Vaidya and Schwarzschild metrics.

See also 

Schwarzschild metric
Null dust solution

References

Exact solutions in general relativity
Black holes
Astrophysics